Jana Novotná and Arantxa Sánchez Vicario were the defending champions but only Novotná competed that year with Lindsay Davenport.

Davenport and Novotná lost in the final 7–5, 4–6, 6–1 against Mary Joe Fernández and Martina Hingis.

Seeds
Champion seeds are indicated in bold text while text in italics indicates the round in which those seeds were eliminated. The top four seeded teams received byes into the second round.

Draw

Finals

Top half

Bottom half

External links
 1997 Family Circle Cup Doubles draw

Charleston Open
1997 WTA Tour